Summit is an album by Argentinean bandoneonist Astor Piazzolla and jazz saxophonist Gerry Mulligan. The original LP was recorded and released in Italy in 1974.

Background
The album was born from the meeting, which took place in Italy in 1974, between the Argentinean bandoneon player Astor Piazzolla and the North American saxophonist Gerry Mulligan, considered among the most prominent members of the world music scene.

The album was recorded in Milan and includes eight compositions, seven written by Piazzolla and one by Mulligan. The fusion of the nuevo tango of Astor Piazzolla with the jazz influences of Gerry Mulligan, backed by an orchestra of Italian and Argentinian musicians, has been described as "a memorable disc of rare beauty" and "a one-off event, wholly successful".

Recording
The album was recorded on 24–26 September and 1–4 October 1974 at Mondial Sound Studio in Milan, Italy, by sound engineer Tonino Paolillo.

Release history
The release history of Summit appears somewhat loose. The LP was originally released in 1974 on the Italian label Erre T.V. Besides a release on the short-lived label of the German chemical company BASF the album was re-released the following year by the German WEA on the Atlantic Records label as Tango Nuevo. In Latin America the album was released as Reunión cumbre on the Argentinian label Trova and (without further title) in Brazil on Pick Jazz. Although several times reissued on CD since the late 1980s the album was not digitally remastered yet.

Track listing 
All songs written, arranged and conducted by Astor Piazzolla, except track 6, "Aire de Buenos Aires" was written by Gerry Mulligan.

 "20 Years Ago" - 6:26
 "Close Your Eyes and Listen"  - 4:32
 "Years of Solitude" - 4:07
 "Deus Xango" - 3:45 
 "20 Years After" - 4:10  
 "Aire de Buenos Aires" - 4:37 
 "Reminiscence" - 6:30
 "Summit" - 3:35

Personnel

Musicians
 Astor Piazzolla - bandoneon
 Gerry Mulligan - baritone saxophone
 Angel 'Pocho' Gatti - piano, Fender Rhodes 73 electric piano, organ
 Tullio De Piscopo - drums, percussion
 Pino Presti - electric bass
 Alberto Baldan, Gianni Zilioli - marimba
 Filippo Daccò, Bruno De Filippi - electric guitar
 String section with
 Umberto Benedetti Michelangeli - 1st violin
 Renato Riccio - 1st viola
 Enio Miori - 1st cello

Production
 Producers - Aldo Pagani, Mario Fattori, Fabio Belotti
 Executive Producer - Aldo Pagani
 Sound engineer - Tonino Paolillo
 Original cover design - Roberto Carra, Marco Cambieri
 Original cover photos - Alberto Rizzo

References 

1974 albums
Gerry Mulligan albums
Astor Piazzolla albums
Jazz albums by Argentine artists
Tango albums